Jasna Bogunović Jakobsen is a Norwegian wind engineer who studies the structural loads and aeroelastic flutter caused by wind on bridges and bridge cables. She is a professor in the Department of Machinery, Building and Materials Technology at the University of Stavanger.

Education and career
Jakobsen earned a PhD at the Norwegian Institute of Technology in 1994,
and joined the University of Stavanger faculty as an associate professor of civil engineering in 1995. She became a full professor in 2003.

Contributions
Jakobsen has used a combination of anemometers and accelerometers to study the effects of wind on the Lysefjord Bridge in Norway. Her research on using lidar to measure wind speeds has been used to ensure the safety of a bridge across the Bjørnafjorden, designed to be the world's longest floating bridge.

Recognition
Jakobsen is a member of the Norwegian Academy of Technological Sciences.

References

External links

Year of birth missing (living people)
Living people
Norwegian Institute of Technology alumni
Academic staff of the University of Stavanger
Norwegian civil engineers
Norwegian women engineers
Members of the Norwegian Academy of Technological Sciences
20th-century women engineers
21st-century women engineers
20th-century Norwegian women